Frank William Steen (October 5, 1913 – April 2, 1998) was a player in the National Football League. He played with the Green Bay Packers during the 1939 NFL season.

References

People from Longview, Texas
Green Bay Packers players
Rice Owls football players
1913 births
1998 deaths
Players of American football from Texas